The Cambridge Redhawks are a Canadian junior ice hockey team based in Cambridge, Ontario, Canada. They compete in the Midwestern division of the Greater Ontario Junior Hockey League (GOJHL). From 1986 to 2018, the franchise played in nearby Guelph under various monikers such as Platers, Fire, Dominators, and Hurricanes.

History
Founded in 1960 as the Hespeler Shamrocks, the team became the Cambridge Shamrocks in 1979 due to a town amalgamation. In 1982, the Shamrocks were purchased by Joe Holody and moved to Guelph to become the farm team to the Guelph Platers (OHL). The team kept the "Platers" moniker until 1996, despite their parent club moving and stranding them to become the Owen Sound Platers in 1989. The team became known as the Fire in 1996 for four seasons before rebranding once again as the Dominators until 2009.

The team first played in the Central Junior C Hockey League, a league now known as the Western Junior C Hockey League. In 1970, they joined the Mid-Ontario Junior B Hockey League, and in 1971 joined the new Central Junior B Hockey League, the precursor to the Ontario Junior Hockey League. In 1974 they moved to the Waterloo-Wellington Junior B League, which, in 1977, became the Midwestern Junior Hockey League and have been there ever since.

During the mid to late 90s the Guelph Platers operated as the "farm team" for the Guelph Storm. They would wear the same colour scheme as the original team (with the classic lightning bolt theme) and played out of Guelph Memorial Gardens. While the team generally did not fare well on the ice during most of this period, they had several players drafted into the OHL, receive walk-on tryouts to Major Junior teams, and US college scholarships. Eventually the Platers would become the Guelph Fire. This lasted just four seasons before the team was purchased by a local pizza shop owner who rebranded the team as the Guelph Dominators. In 2009, the Dominators became the Guelph Hurricanes, calling Sleeman Centre home.

In May 2018, it was announced the Hurricanes were relocating back to Cambridge, taking over the market recently occupied by the Cambridge Winter Hawks who left the league in 2017.

Season-by-season record

Honours
1962–63 Central Junior C Hockey League regular season winner
1963–64 Central Junior C Hockey League regular season winner; playoff winner; Schmalz Cup winner: defeated Lindsay Lions
1969–70 Western Junior C Hockey League regular season winner; playoff winner; Schmalz Cup runner-up: defeated by Newmarket Redmen
2010–11 Greater Ontario Junior Hockey League Midwestern Conference regular season winner
2021-22 Greater Ontario Junior Hockey League Midwestern Conference playoff winner

Notable alumni
Cody Bass (2002–03)
Greg Jacina (1998–99)
Brian McGrattan (1997–98)
Matt Moulson (2000–02)
Rumun Ndur (1992–93)
Mark Versteeg-Lytwyn (2002–03)
Bob Wren (1989–91)
Rob Zamuner (1986)

References

External links
Redhawks Webpage
GOJHL Webpage

Ice hockey teams in Ontario
Sport in Guelph
1960 establishments in Ontario
Ice hockey clubs established in 1960
Greater Ontario Junior Hockey League